The Ritsumeikan Panthers football program, established in 1953, represents Ritsumeikan University in college football. Ritsumeikan is a member of the Kansai Collegiate American Football League.

History

Coaching history

Records, championships, and notable games

Notable players
Masafumi Kawaguchi
Noriaki Kinoshita

External links
  official website
 

American football teams established in 1953
American football in Japan
1953 establishments in Japan
Sports teams in Kyoto Prefecture